is a railway station located in Kagoshima, Kagoshima, Japan.
The station opened in 1966.

Lines 
Kyushu Railway Company
Ibusuki Makurazaki Line

JR

Adjacent stations

Nearby places
The International University of Kagoshima and Junior College
Wada Junior School
Sakanoue Post Office

Railway stations in Kagoshima Prefecture
Railway stations in Japan opened in 1930